Betairidovirinae is a subfamily of viruses in the family Iridoviridae that was established in 2016. It is one of two subfamilies within this family, the other being Alphairdovirinae. Most species within the Betairidovirinae are hosted by invertebrates, whereas all species within the Alphairdovirinae are hosted by 'cold-blooded' vertebrates (namely; fishes, amphibians, and reptiles). As such, viruses in this subfamily may be called invertebrate iridescent viruses (IIVs) or invertebrate iridoviruses.

Genera 
The genus consists of the following four genera, although  many additional putative and partially characterised taxa are known:
 Chloriridovirus
 Daphniairidovirus
 Decapodiridovirus
 Iridovirus

Hosts 
The Betairidovirinae are hosted by invertebrates, but some research indicates they may hosted by vertebrates, and that at least one invertebrate-hosted iridovirus is actually more closely related to the Alphairdovirinae. Most Betairidovirinae hosts are arthropods, especially insects and woodlice, but other arthropods and even several non-arthropod hosts are known. Some viruses are hosted by a single host species; others are generalists that can infect multiple species.

Disease 
Some species within this subfamily cause no externally obvious disease. Others cause a generalised reduction in fitness. Invertebrate iridoviral diseases are most noted for some species that cause iridescence in their hosts because icosahedral virions may accumulate in high density in the tissues of the host, forming a paracrystalline array that reflects particular wavelengths of light. Iridescent blue is most common, but colours across the spectrum have been observed. Most species with smaller virions produce colours towards the violet side of the colour spectrum, whereas larger virions tend towards the red side.

See also 
 Cypovirus – members of this genus may also cause iridescence

References

External links 
 iNaturalist – Betairidovirinae

Iridoviridae
Virus subfamilies